Jungle Queen is a 2000 Pakistani film directed by Syed Noor and written by his then-wife, Rukhsana Noor. The film stars Saima (aka Saima Noor after marrying director Syed Noor in 2005) as the title character. Actress Saima plays a double role.

In the beginning, the title character, played by Saima, is secretly married to a wealthy man. After discovering that she is pregnant, her husband tries to kill her by throwing her in a river. She ends up landing on an island and given shelter by animals. She gives birth to a baby girl and dies, when the girl is five years old. That girl later grows up like Tarzan and that character is also played by Saima.

Cast
 Saima
 Moammar Rana
 Afzal Khan 
 Saira Khan
 Khushboo
 Shafqat Cheema
 Nawaz Khan

References

External links

 

2000s Urdu-language films
Pakistani romantic drama films
2000 films
Films directed by Syed Noor
Films scored by M Ashraf
Pakistani fantasy films
Urdu-language Pakistani films